Tha Truth, Pt. 2 is the eighth studio album by American rapper Trae tha Truth. The album was released on February 5, 2016, by ABN Entertainment, Grand Hustle Records and Empire Distribution.

Track listing

Personnel
Credits for Tha Truth, Pt. 2 adapted from AllMusic.

B.o.B — featured artist
Bizness Boi — producer
Club Cadet — producer
Soot J Cash — producer
Roscoe Dash — featured artist
S Dot — producer
Ink — featured artist, producer
J-Dawg — featured artist
Jay'Ton — featured artist
D. Lylez — featured artist
The Maven Boys — producer
Megaman — producer
Nick Miles — producer
Quentin Miller — featured artist
J. Oliver — producer
Liz Rodrigues — featured Artist
Rick Ross — featured Artist
Miguel Scott — mastering
T.I. — executive producer
Trae tha Truth — executive producer, primary artist
Ty Dolla Sign — featured artist
Watch the Duck — featured artist, producer
Watson the Great — engineer, mixing, producer
Wiz Khalifa — featured Artist
Yo Gotti — featured Artist
Young Thug — featured Artist

Charts

References

2016 albums
Sequel albums
Empire Distribution albums
Grand Hustle Records albums
Trae tha Truth albums